Hogan is the given name of:

Hogan Bassey (1932-1998), Nigeria's first world boxing champion
Hogan Ephraim (born 1988), English footballer
 Hogan Gidley, American, Republican, White House Deputy Press Secretary
Hogan Jimoh (born 1955), Nigerian boxer of the 1970s and '80s
Hogan McLaughlin (born 1989), American fashion designer, artist, dancer and musician
Hogan Sheffer (born 1958), American television writer